This is a list of years in Tajikistan.

20th century

21st century

 
Tajikistan history-related lists
Tajikistan